Walter Griffin may refer to:

 Walter Griffin (painter) (1861–1935), American painter
 Walter Burley Griffin (1876–1937), American architect and landscape architect
 Walter L. Griffin (1889–1954), founder of the American Society of Cinematographers
 Walter Griffin (poet) (born 1937), American poet